Chalu (also Romanized as Chalū) is a village in Howmeh Rural District, in the Central District of Shirvan County, North Khorasan Province, Iran. At the 2006 census, its population was 949, in 208 families.

References 

Populated places in Shirvan County